The Golders Green Beth Hamedrash (popularly known as Munk's or GGBH) is an independent Ashkenazi Orthodox Jewish congregation located in Golders Green, London, United Kingdom. Most of the founders were refugees from Nazi Germany before and during World War II. It was founded in 1934 in the King Alfred School, and was located for many years in the Lincoln Institute in Broadwalk Lane. It moved to its present location in The Riding in 1956.

The figure that made his mark on the beit midrash between the 1930s and the 1970s was Rabbi Dr.  (1900–1978), a PhD in English Literature and a representative of the 'Torah im Derech Eretz' school, founded by Rabbi Samson Raphael Hirsch, which combines the study of Torah with earning a livelihood. Rabbi Chaim Feldman served as rabbi from the 1970s until he retired in 2007; he died in 2020. The present rabbi is Rabbi Yisroel Meir Greenberg.

It is a constituent of the Kedassia kashruth organization. It has also established Menorah Primary School and Menorah High School, amongst many others.

External links
 Official site

References

Ashkenazi Jewish culture in London
Ashkenazi synagogues
German-Jewish culture in the United Kingdom
Golders Green
Synagogues in London
Jewish organizations established in 1936
Orthodox synagogues in England